"Let's Have a Party" is a 1957 song written by Jessie Mae Robinson and recorded by Elvis Presley for the movie Loving You. It was released as a single in the United Kingdom under the title "Party" and peaked at #2 in the UK Singles Chart. Wanda Jackson recorded the song for her first album, Wanda Jackson, released in 1958. The song was released as a single by Jackson in 1960 and entered the UK chart on 1 September of that year, spending eight weeks there and reaching #32; it also reached #37 on the Billboard Hot 100 in 1960. The Jackson version was later featured in the 1989 film Dead Poets Society. Paul McCartney also recorded and released the song (under the title "Party") on his 1999 Run Devil Run album. His original song "Run Devil Run", on the album of the same name, also has a similar melody. A cover of "Let's Have a Party" by Sonia was included on the 2010 remastered edition of her 1989 album Everybody Knows.

The song was included under the title "Party" in the Broadway musical Million Dollar Quartet, which opened in New York in April 2010.  It was sung by Robert Britton Lyons, portraying Carl Perkins, as well as by the company of the show, and was covered by Robert Britton Lyons and the company on the Million Dollar Quartet original Broadway cast recording.

In T. Rex's 1972 concert film Born to Boogie, Marc Bolan and Ringo Starr attempt to recite one of the lyrics from the song ("some people like to rock, some people like to roll, but movin' and a-groovin's gonna satisfy my soul"). However, they break into laughter each time.

Led Zeppelin also played this song live during their live sets of "Whole Lotta Love"; an example of this practice can be found on their live album How the West Was Won.

English glam rock band Mud recorded the song for their 1975 album Mud Rock Volume 2.

Rock and roll band Dr. Feelgood included the song on their 1978 album Private Practice.

Chart performance

Elvis Presley version

Wanda Jackson version

References 

1957 songs
1960 singles
Elvis Presley songs
Wanda Jackson songs
Paul McCartney songs
Sonia (singer) songs
Songs written by Jessie Mae Robinson
Capitol Records singles
Song recordings produced by Ken Nelson (American record producer)
Songs written for films
Music published by MPL Music Publishing